Marion Township is a township in Washington County, Iowa, USA.

History
Marion Township was laid off in 1844.

References

Townships in Washington County, Iowa
Townships in Iowa
1844 establishments in Iowa Territory